Jesus "Jesse" Camacho Borja (born September 14, 1948) is a Northern Mariana Islander politician and lawyer who served as the fourth lieutenant governor of the Northern Mariana Islands from January 10, 1994 until January 12, 1998 under former Democratic Governor Froilan Tenorio.

Biography

Early life
Borja was born on September 14, 1948, to parents, Antonia Sablan Camacho and Ricardo Tudela Borja. He married his wife, the former Mary Anne Mangloña Pangelinan, in July 1972. The couple have six children - Dora, Leticia, Jesse, Richard, Amanda and Emmanuel.

He received a Juris Doctor in 1974 from the Georgetown University Law Center in Washington D.C.

Career
Borja served as an associate justice of the Northern Mariana Islands Supreme Court from 1989 until 1993. He has also worked as a lawyer in a law practice for several years.

In 1993, Democratic gubernatorial candidate Froilan Tenorio chose Borja as his running mate for the 1993 election. Tenorio and Borja were elected as the governor and lieutenant governor of the Northern Mariana Islands in the gubernatorial election. Borja was sworn in as the 4th lieutenant governor of the Northern Mariana Islands on January 10, 1994. 

After Tenorio declared he would not seek re-election in 1997, Borja announced his campaign to succeed him.  Tenorio subsequently changed his mind, resulting in a three-way race.  Ultimately, the nominee of the Republican Party, former governor Pedro P. Tenorio, won the election easily with 45.6% of the vote. Democratic support was split between Governor Tenorio and Lieutenant Governor Borja.  Tenorio received 27.4% of the vote and Borja received 27%.  Borja left office on January 12, 1998 and was succeeded as Lt. Governor by Jesus Sablan.

In the 2001 gubernatorial election campaign, Borja announced his candidacy for Governor of the Northern Mariana Islands, choosing running mate Bridget Ichihara. His opponents in the election were Republican Juan Babauta, Covenant Party candidate Benigno Fitial and Democratic former Governor Froilan Tenorio. Borja lost the 2001 election, coming in third behind winner Juan Babauta and Benigno Fitial. Babauta and his running mate, Diego Benavente, won the election with 44.9 of the vote, Fitial came in second with 25.5%, Borja placed third with 18.0% and Tenorio finished last with 11.5% of the total vote.

In April 2010, Borja announced his candidacy as a Democrat for Delegate of the Northern Mariana Islands to the United States House of Representatives in the 2010 election. In a letter of intent to the chairmen of the CNMI Democratic Party Jesse T. Torres, Borja wrote, "I am highly qualified to fill the position of Washington delegate. In particular, my legal education at Georgetown University, my experience as a justice of our Supreme Court, my experience as lieutenant governor, and my experience as a member of the NMI Commission on Federal Laws make me uniquely qualified to be the CNMI's Washington delegate." Borja officially filed to run for the seat on July 28, 2010.

Borja challenged the incumbent Rep. Gregorio "Killi" Sablan, the first delegate ever elected from the Northern Mariana Islands to the U.S. House. Joe Camacho of the 
Covenant Party and Republican Juan Babauta, who served as governor from 2002 until 2006, also sought the seat. Sablan won re-election against all three challengers.

References

|-

1948 births
Democratic Party (Northern Mariana Islands) politicians
Georgetown University Law Center alumni
Lieutenant Governors of the Northern Mariana Islands
Living people
Northern Mariana Islands lawyers